The Kimberley spangled perch (Leiotherapon macrolepsis), also known as the large-scale grunter,  is a species of freshwater ray-finned fish from the family Terapontidae. It is endemic to the Kimberley region of Western Australia. It is one of the most common species in one of the tributaries of the Prince Regent River.

It is sometimes kept as an aquarium pet.

References

External links
 Fishes of Australia : Leiopotherapon macrolepis

Kimberley spangled perch
Freshwater fish of Western Australia
Kimberley (Western Australia)
Kimberley spangled perch
Taxonomy articles created by Polbot